The Online Film Critics Society Award for Best Editing is an annual film award given by the Online Film Critics Society to honor the best editing of the year. These awards are noted in the established print media such as Variety and The Hollywood Reporter.

Winners
This list of the annual winners is extracted from the annual lists of nominees and winners posted by the Online Film Critics Society. The nominees and awards are also posted at the Internet Movie Database.

1990s

2000s

2010s

2020s

References

Film editing awards